Arthur Shaw is the name of:

 Arthur Shaw (athlete) (1886–1955), American athlete
 Arthur Shaw (footballer, born 1924) (1924–2015), English professional footballer
 Arthur Shaw (footballer, born 1869) (1869–1946), English footballer
 Arthur Shaw (trade unionist) (1880–1939), British trade union leader

See also
Artie Shaw (1910–2004), American clarinetist, composer, and bandleader
Arthur Shores (1904–1996), American civil rights attorney